This was the first edition of the event.

Tom Okker won the title, defeating Butch Buchholz 8–6, 6–2, 6–1 in the final.

Seeds
All four seeds received a bye to the second round.

  Tony Roche (semifinals)
  John Newcombe (quarterfinals)
  Tom Okker (champion)
  Butch Buchholz (final)

Draw

Final

Section 1

Section 2

External links
 1969 Paris Open draw

Singles